Terço dos Homens (en: Men's Rosary) is a Brazilian lay Catholic movement of Marian prayer by men only. 

It consists in groups of local men who engage in group praying of the mysteries of the Rosary weekly at their parishes or community centers.

The movement grew with the help of priests from the Schoenstatt Apostolic Movement. 

The priest who is the national responsible for the movement is the Archbishop of Juiz de Fora, Gil Antônio Moreira, according to the Brazilian Episcopal Conference (CNBB).

History
Since the 1500s there have been manly Marian groups of prayer in Brazil. The modern expression "Terço dos Homens" (Men's Rosary) was noticed for the first time in 1936. The 21st century "wave", however, started only in 1996, in Jaboatão dos Guararapes, Recife metropolitan area, in the state of Pernambuco. From there it established in the nearby Olinda Sanctuary, from where it spread to all 26 states of Brazil and the Federal District.

Women's version 
The prayer of the Rosary is traditionally associated with women, who pray individually in their homes and parishes. However, a women's movement was founded, based on the good male example of prayer that developed. This Rosary women's prayer movement is called the Terço das Mulheres (Women's Rosary). The anthem of the movement was composed by Adriana Gil. The first pilgrimage of female tercistas to the National Sanctuary of Aparecida took place in 2014. In 2023 the 10th edition of the pilgrimage takes place, from March 10 to 12.

Annual meetings

National meeting 
Every year, in February, the movement gathers at the Basilica of Our Lady of Aparecida.

State meetings 
Southeast region
 Espírito Santo: last Saturday in May at the Penha Convent, in Vitória.

 Minas Gerais: end of August or early September at the Our Lady of Sorrows Basilica, in Caeté.

Northeastern region
 Maranhão: last Sunday in April.
 Pernambuco: March 5.
 Bahia: Divine Mercy Sunday.

South region
 Paraná and Santa Catarina: at the highland of Southern Paraná and Northern Santa Catarina, at the end of September.

Modern issues

COVID-19 pandemic and estimation of the number of members 
During the COVID-19 pandemic, the movement was severely restricted. Even though, archbishop Gil Antônio Moreira estimates that more than two million Brazilian men engage in the movement. That corresponds to ~1% of the Brazilian entire population, 215 millions.

African countries in war 
Pope Francis asked the members of Terço dos Homens to pray for two African nations in civil war: the Democratic Republic of the Congo and South Sudan.

Brazilian National Men's Rosary Day: September 8
The federal deputy Eros Biondini (Partido Liberal-Minas Gerais) proposed the law 2676/21, which establishes September 8 as the National Men's Rosary Day. Federal deputy Evair Viera de Melo (Progressistas-Espírito Santo) redacted it. The date coincides with the Nativity of Our Lady. The law was approved by the Chamber of Deputies in June 2022. It still depends on being approved by the Senate and sanctioned by president Jair Bolsonaro.

In other countries

Hispanic countries 
The Hispanic version of the movement, present in other South American countries (Argentina, Paraguai etc.), is called Rosario de Hombres Valientes.

USA 
In the USA, Brazilian manly migrants pray the Rosary under the expected translated name of Terço dos Homens: Men's Rosary.

Bibliography 

 Livro do Terço dos Homens: Manual Completo e Explicativo. Paulus, 2020. ISBN 6555620757
 Terço dos Homens. Associação do Senhor Jesus. 2022. ISBN 6599136230
 Terço dos Homens e a Grande Missão Masculina. Canção Nova, 2015. ISBN 857677481X
 Terço dos Homens: Uma razão em nossa fé, para uma fé com mais razão. Paulinas, 2016. ISBN 8535642250
 Rosário Bíblico do Terço dos Homens. Paulus, 2019. ISBN 8534948291

External links
 Official webpage

References

Catholic Church in Brazil